East v Maurer [1990] EWCA Civ 6 is an English contract law case concerning misrepresentation.

Facts
Maurer fraudulently told East he would not run a competing hair salon, so East bought the salon from Maurer. Maurer started to run a competing hair salon. East lost business. East then sued Maurer for deceit.

Judgment
"The Court of Appeal held that East could recover the price paid minus selling price, plus trading losses, plus expenses of buying and selling and carrying out improvements, plus £10,000 in foregone profits. It noted that foregone profits were recoverable in tort where the claimant might be expected to make them in a similar hairdressing business. To recover profits that would have been particular to this business, breach of a contractual warranty needed to be shown."

See also

English contract law
Misrepresentation in English law
Smith New Court Ltd v Scrimgeour Vickers (Asset Management) Ltd [1997] AC 254, Lord Steyn said East ‘shows that an award based on the hypothetical profitable business in which the plaintiff would have engaged but for deceit is permissible: it is classic consequential loss.’

Notes

References

English misrepresentation case law
Court of Appeal (England and Wales) cases
1990 in case law
1990 in British law